The 2013 Auckland local elections took place between 20 September and 12 October and were conducted by postal vote. The elections were the second since the merger of seven councils into the Auckland Council, which is composed of the mayor and 20 councillors, and 149 members of 21 local boards. Twenty-one district health board members and 41 licensing trust members were also elected. The previous elections were in 2010. Early (not final) voting figures are below. The overall effect of the election was a shift of the Auckland Council to the right.

Mayoral election

Incumbent Len Brown was re-elected.

Council ward elections
20 members were elected to governing body of the Auckland Council across thirteen wards.

Rodney (1)

Albany (2)

North Shore (2)

Waitakere (2)

Waitemata and Gulf (1)

Whau (1)

Albert-Eden-Roskill (2)

Maungakiekie-Tamaki (1)

Manukau (2)

Manurewa-Papakura (2)

Franklin (1)

Ōrākei (1)

Howick (2)

Local board elections

Licensing trust elections

Birkenhead Licensing Trust (6)

Mt Wellington Licensing Trust (6)

Portage Licensing Trust

Ward No 1 – Auckland City (3)

Ward No 2 – New Lynn (2)

Ward No 3 – Glen Eden (2)

Ward No 4 – Titirangi / Green Bay (2)

Ward No 5 – Kelston West (1)

Waitakere Licensing Trust

Ward No 1 – Te Atatū (2)

Ward No 2 –Lincoln (3)

Ward No 3 – Waitakere (1)

Ward No 4 – Henderson (1)

Wiri Licensing Trust (6)

See also
2013 New Zealand local elections
2013 Auckland local board elections

References

External links
2013 Election candidates aucklandcouncil.govt.nz

Auckland
Auckland
Local elections 2013
2010s in Auckland